Thiratoscirtus perspicuus is a species of jumping spider in the genus Thiratoscirtus that lives in the Democratic Republic of the Congo and Ivory Coast. It was first described in 2013.

References

Fauna of the Democratic Republic of the Congo
Fauna of Ivory Coast
Salticidae
Spiders described in 2013
Spiders of Africa